Seeta was a 1933 Indian talkie Bengali film, directed by Debaki Bose and produced by the East India Film Company. It won an honorary diploma in the 2nd Venice International Film Festival in 1934, becoming the first Indian talkie to be shown at an international film festival. The film starred Gul Hamid, Prithviraj Kapoor as Rama, Durga Khote as Sita and Trilok Kapoor as Luv.

References

External links 

 Seeta (1934) on indiancine.ma

1934 films
Bengali-language Indian films
1930s Bengali-language films
Indian black-and-white films